Aventis Aventisian (born 17 August 2002) is a Greek professional footballer who plays as a left-back for Eredivisie club Go Ahead Eagles.

International career
Born in Greece, Aventisian is of Armenian descent. He is a former youth international for Greece, having played for the Greece U17s. He was called up to the senior Armenia national team in November 2022.

References

2002 births
Living people
Greek footballers
Greece youth international footballers
Greek people of Armenian descent
Eredivisie players
Go Ahead Eagles players
Greek expatriate footballers
Expatriate footballers in the Netherlands
Association football defenders
Footballers from Thessaloniki
Greek expatriate sportspeople in the Netherlands